Mount Field is a rural locality in the local government areas of Central Highlands and Derwent Valley in the Central and South-east regions of Tasmania. The 2016 census determined a population of 3 for the state suburb of Mount Field.

History
Mount Field is a confirmed suburb/locality.

Etymology
It is believed that the locality was named for Mount Field National Park, which was named for Judge Barron Field, who visited Tasmania as an itinerant judge in 1819 and 1821.

Geography
The locality is almost wholly contained within Mount Field National Park.

Road infrastructure
The C609 route (Lake Dobson Road) enters from the east and runs generally west to Lake Dobson, where it terminates.

References

Localities of Central Highlands Council
Localities of Derwent Valley Council
Towns in Tasmania